Dolsan-eup or Dolsan town is a town in the Yeosu city in South Korea. It is located on the Dolsan island. Yeosu city hall Dolsan office (3rd city hall) is in here.

Villages 
The following villages are listed as administrative divisions:

Traffic 
Dolsan town has no expressways and 2 National highways. That 2 national highways are No. 17 and No. 77.

It has 3 bridges — , Geobukseon bridge, and Hwatae bridge. Dolsan bridge is on national route 77. It connect with Yeosu peninsula. Geobukseon bridge is on national route 17. It connect with Yeosu peninsula, too. Hwatae bridge is on national route 77. It connect with Hwatae island.

Yeosu
Towns and townships in South Jeolla Province